CGH may refer to:

 Comparative genomic hybridization
 Computer-generated holography
 the IATA airport code of Congonhas-São Paulo Airport
 Changi General Hospital, a hospital in Simei, Singapore
 Chinese General Hospital
 Colorado General Hospital, former name of University of Colorado Hospital
 cGh physics, a characterization of unified physical theories encompassing relativity, gravitation and quantum mechanics
 Coventry Godiva Harriers
 Chief of the Order of the Golden Heart of Kenya